Gargallo may refer to:

Places
 Gargallo, Piedmont, a commune in the province of Novara, Piedmont, Italy
 Priolo Gargallo, a commune in the province of Syracuse, Sicily, Italy
 Gargallo, Aragon, a municipality in the province of Teruel, Aragon, Spain

People with the surname
Ligia Gargallo, Chilean chemist and professor
Pablo Gargallo (1881–1934), Spanish sculptor and painter